The Theory of Interstellar Trade is a paper written in 1978 by the economist Paul Krugman. The paper was first published in March 2010 in the journal Economic Inquiry. He described the paper as something he wrote to cheer himself up when he was an "oppressed assistant professor" caught up in the academic rat race.

Krugman analyzed the question of
 How should interest rates on goods in transit be computed when the goods travel at close to the speed of light? This is a problem because the time taken in transit will appear less to an observer traveling with the goods than to a stationary observer.

Krugman emphasized that in spite of its farcical subject matter, the economic analysis in the paper is correctly done. In his own words,
 This paper, then, is a serious analysis of a ridiculous subject, which is of course the opposite of what is usual in economics.

Commentary
Responding to the paper, the economist Tyler Cowen speculated on how time travel affects time preference discounting.
 My own puzzling focuses on the determinants of real interest rates, given how time dilation changes the meaning of time preference.  As you approach the speed of light you move into the future relative to more stationary observers.  So can you not leave a penny in a savings account, take a very rapid spaceflight, and come back to earth "many years later" as a billionaire?  Hardly any time has passed for you.  In essence we are abolishing time preference, or at least allowing people to lower their time preference by spending money on fuel.  I believe that in such worlds the real interest rate cannot exceed the costs at which more fuel can "propel you into the future through time dilation."
 

Assume you have a spaceship that can approach lightspeed and thus you can make, say 1,000 years, seem like 10 years. If you can gain the time value of money 100 times faster, that effectively makes the interest rate 100x higher for you. Thus time preference is meaningless. This is a problem for economic theory. Krugman's solution is to force the interest rate to correspond to the cost of making the trip.

Here is the standard compound interest formula:
 FV = PV(1+i)n

Fuel costs for the above trip are $X. Let us say you have $1,000 to invest and wonder whether it is worth taking a near-lightspeed voyage to increase your return 10 subjective years from now.

Stay on earth:
 A = $1000(1 + i)10
Take trip:
 B = ($1000(1 + i)1000) – $X

Krugman says that it is necessarily true that A=B, for time preference theory to stay consistent; thus it will be driven by X. In the future, given a free market, spaceship fuel costs will be the primary determinant of interest rates. The less the fuel cost, the less the interest rate, and vice versa.

Related theories and publications
In 2004, Espen Gaarder Haug published a theory he titled "SpaceTime-Finance" in Wilmott magazine to show how a series of finance calculations had to be adjusted to avoid arbitrage when hypothetically traveling at very high velocities relative to other observers (traders). He illustrated how such necessary adjustments already could be measurable at the speed of the space shuttle, but also that such calculations and adjustments were of little or no practical relevance today since we all are moving at the nearly same speed relative to the enormous speed of light.

In 2008, John Hickman at Berry College in Georgia (USA) published in the Journal of Astro Politics an article related to the political and cultural obstacles that could be related to hypothetical interstellar trade. A 2009 article explored tax implications.

References

Further reading
 Espen Gaarder Haug. "SpaceTime Finance"  in the book 'Derivatives Models on Models', John Wiley & Sons, 2007
 John Hickman. "Problems of Interplanetary and Interstellar Trade". Journal of Astropolitics, Vol.6, No. 1. (January 2008). pp. 95–104.
 "Trading with Aliens", Charter Magazine, Dec 2013,

1978 documents
Economic theories
Works by Paul Krugman